Hell and High Water" is a song written by Alex Harvey and co-written and recorded by American country music artist T. Graham Brown.  It was released in September 1986 as the third single from the album I Tell It Like It Used to Be.  The song was Brown's third country hit and the first of three number ones on the country chart.  The single went to number one for one week and spent a total of fifteen weeks on the country chart.

Charts

Weekly charts

Year-end charts

References

1986 singles
1986 songs
T. Graham Brown songs
Capitol Records Nashville singles
Songs written by T. Graham Brown